Pangkalan Stungkor (also known as Pang Stungkor) is a settlement in Lundu District, Kuching Division, Sarawak, Malaysia.

Neighbouring settlements include:

References

Lundu District
Populated places in Sarawak